Katrina Bowden (born September 19, 1988) is an American actress. She is best known for her roles as Cerie on the NBC sitcom 30 Rock (2006–2013) and as Flo Fulton on the CBS daytime soap opera The Bold and the Beautiful (2019–2021). She has also appeared in the films Tucker & Dale vs. Evil, Sex Drive, Piranha 3DD, American Reunion, and Scary Movie 5.

Early life
Bowden was raised in Wyckoff, New Jersey. She attended the now-defunct Saint Thomas More School in Midland Park, New Jersey. She later attended Immaculate Heart Academy in Washington Township, New Jersey.

Career
In 2006, Bowden landed her first acting role in a two-episode arc on ABC's daytime soap opera One Life to Live as Britney. She has since guest-starred on shows such as Law & Order: Special Victims Unit and Ugly Betty. Bowden's breakthrough role came when she was cast as a recurring character on the Emmy Award-winning television series 30 Rock, which premiered on October 11, 2006 on NBC. She portrayed the attractive receptionist Cerie, and with the cast received seven Screen Actors Guild Award nominations and one win. She signed on as a regular for the show's second season in 2007, and appeared in the series through to its series finale in January 2013.  

She appears in the music videos "Dance, Dance" by Fall Out Boy, as well as "After Hours" by We Are Scientists, and "Miss Jackson" by Panic! at the Disco.

In 2008, Bowden made her film debut in the Summit Entertainment comedy film Sex Drive, released to theaters on October 17, 2008. The following year, Bowden starred in two low-budget straight-to-DVD projects The Shortcut and Ratko: The Dictator's Son. In 2010 Bowden starred in the widely acclaimed horror-comedy film Tucker & Dale vs Evil as Allison. The film had a limited release and grossed over $4,749,516 and premiered at the Sundance Film Festival. The film holds a 'fresh' rating of 85% on Rotten Tomatoes.

In April 2011, Bowden was voted as Esquire Magazines Sexiest Woman Alive. She was also the face of the Jordache television campaign that made its premiere in September 2011. In April 2011, Universal Pictures announced that Bowden was cast as the role of Mia, an "L.A. party girl type", and girlfriend to Chris Klein's character, in the fourth installment of the American Pie film trilogy, American Reunion. The film was released on April 5, 2012 to mixed reviews but financial success. Also in 2012, Bowden appeared in the horror films Piranha 3DD, which was panned by critics, and Hold Your Breath, which received a limited theatrical release before being released to DVD. Bowden co-starred in Nurse 3D (2013). In 2018, the actress played the lead role in the Hallmark Channel movie Love on the Slopes, a part of the channel's Winterfest event. She starred in Great White, an Australian survivor horror film, in which two great white sharks circle the crew of a stranded seaplane, which was released in 2021.

Personal life
In May 2013, Bowden married musician and singer Ben Jorgensen, of the band Armor for Sleep. They divorced in 2020.

Filmography

Film

Television

Music videos

References

External links

 
 
 
 Interview at WickedInfo.com

1988 births
21st-century American actresses
Actresses from New Jersey
American child actresses
American film actresses
American television actresses
Immaculate Heart Academy alumni
Living people
People from Wyckoff, New Jersey